Nehzatabad may refer to:
 Nehzatabad, Fereydunshahr, Isfahan Province
 Nehzatabad, Najafabad, Isfahan Province
 Nehzatabad, Kerman
 Nehzatabad, Manujan, Kerman Province
 Nehzatabad, Rudbar-e Jonubi, Kerman Province
 Nehzatabad, Jazmurian, Rudbar-e Jonubi County, Kerman Province
 Nehzatabad, Khuzestan
 Nehzatabad, Kohgiluyeh and Boyer-Ahmad
 Nehzatabad Rural District, in Kerman Province